

Events 
January 18 – The Council of Trent begins a new session, in the course of which it considers decrees relating to sacred music.
Cristofano Malvezzi enters the service of the Medici in Florence.
Alfonso Ferrabosco the elder arrives in England and is employed at the court of Queen Elizabeth I of England.
Rinaldo del Mel begins his musical studies at the Cathedral of St. Rombaut.

Publications 
Pietro Aron – , fourth edition
Claude Goudimel – Fifth book of psalms for four and five voices (Paris: Le Roy & Ballard)
Jacobus de Kerle
 (Special Prayers for the Health and Success of the General Council) for four voices (Venice: Antonio Gardano), setting of texts by Pedro de Soto for the Council of Trent
First book of six masses for four and five voices (Venice: Antonio Gardano)
Orlande de Lassus –  for five voices (Nuremberg: Johann vom Berg & Ulrich Neuber)
Philippe de Monte – First book of madrigal for four voices (Venice: Angelo Gardano)

Classical music

Births 
January 20 – Ottavio Rinuccini, Italian librettist (died 1621)
April/May – Jan Pieterszoon Sweelinck, Dutch organist and composer (died 1621)
John Milton, English amateur composer (died 1647)
probable – John Bull, English composer and organ builder (died 1628)

Deaths 
February 15 – Cornelius Canis, Flemish composer (born c.1500–1510)
October 13 – Claudin de Sermisy, French composer (born c.1490)
December 7 – Adrian Willaert, Flemish composer (born c.1490)
probable – Perissone Cambio, Franco-Flemish composer and singer

References

 
Music
16th century in music
Music by year